Pauline Foulds is a retired British swimmer who won five Paralympic gold medals representing Great Britain. Foulds, who was injured in a riding accident and paralysed from the waist down, won two golds in the 1960 Summer Paralympics in Rome and then three gold medals in Tokyo 1964.

References

Paralympic gold medalists for Great Britain
Medalists at the 1960 Summer Paralympics
Medalists at the 1964 Summer Paralympics
Paralympic medalists in swimming
Swimmers at the 1960 Summer Paralympics
Swimmers at the 1964 Summer Paralympics
Paralympic swimmers of Great Britain
British female swimmers